Grégory Grisez (born 17 August 1989) is a Belgian footballer who plays for Luxembourger club Fola Esch as a winger.

External links

1989 births
People from La Louvière
Living people
Belgian footballers
Association football midfielders
C.S. Visé players
UR La Louvière Centre players
RWS Bruxelles players
K.S.V. Roeselare players
K Beerschot VA players
CS Fola Esch players
Belgian Pro League players
Challenger Pro League players
Luxembourg National Division players
Belgian expatriate footballers
Expatriate footballers in Luxembourg
Belgian expatriate sportspeople in Luxembourg
Francs Borains players
Footballers from Hainaut (province)